Herbert Lawson (12 April 1905 – 1987) was an English professional footballer who played in the Football League as an outside right, most notably for Brentford and Arsenal.

Career

Arsenal 
After beginning his career as an amateur with hometown Athenian League club Luton Clarence, Lawson joined First Division strugglers Arsenal in 1924. Lawson had to wait until February 1926 to make his professional debut and he enjoyed a run in the team until the end of the 1925–26 season, making 13 appearances and scoring two goals. He failed to make an appearance during the 1926–27 season and departed Highbury in March 1927.

Brentford 
Lawson dropped down to the Third Division South to sign for fellow London club Brentford in May 1927, as a replacement for retired outside forward Patsy Hendren. After making 13 appearances in what remained of the 1926–27 season, Lawson broke into the team the following year and made 34 appearances, scoring 9 goals. He was mostly confined to the reserves for the following three seasons at Griffin Park and helped the team to London Combination titles in 1931–32 and 1932–33. Lawson left Brentford in 1933, having made 64 appearances and scored 12 goals in six years with the club.

Later career 
After a short spell with Third Division South club Luton Town, Lawson finished his career in non-League football with Bedford Town, Vauxhall Motors and Letchworth.

Personal life 
Lawson's father Billy was trainer at Luton Town for 30 years.

Honours 
Brentford Reserves
 London Combination: 1931–32, 1932–33

Career statistics

References

1905 births
Footballers from Luton
English footballers
English Football League players
Association football outside forwards
Brentford F.C. players
Arsenal F.C. players
Luton Town F.C. players
Bedford Town F.C. players
1987 deaths
Letchworth F.C. players
Association football midfielders